John Victor Murra (24 August 1916 – 16 October 2006) was a Ukrainian-American professor of anthropology and a researcher of the Inca Empire.

Biography
Born Isak Lipschitz in Odessa, Ukraine, Russian Empire, in 1916, Murra emigrated to the United States in 1934 and completed an undergraduate degree in sociology at the University of Chicago in 1936.

In 1937, he sailed to Europe and fought in the Spanish Civil War as a foreign volunteer on the side of the Second Spanish Republic. Serving as a member of the Abraham Lincoln Brigade, he initially worked as a smuggler out of Perpignan, France. He then entered Spain and was wounded in battle during the Battle of the Ebro. His injuries later medically precluded him from service in World War II.

Returning to the United States in 1939, he returned to Illinois to continue his studies at the University of Chicago. He finished a master's degree in 1942 and a PhD in 1956, both in anthropology. He taught at the University of Puerto Rico (1947–50), Vassar College (1950–61), Yale (1962–63), Universidad de San Marcos (1964–66), and Cornell University (1968–82).

His work included the development of a new perspective of the Inca Empire, where trade and giftgiving among kin were common. Through extensive perusal of Spanish colonial archives and court documents, he found that the Inca dwelling in the rainforest hiked into the Andes to trade crops for products like wool from their mountain-dwelling kin. Murra called that "the vertical archipelago", and his model has been verified by later research. Some contest components of the theory, but it has become the accepted economic model of the Central Andes.

Murra's writings include The Economic Organization of the Inca State (1956), Cloth and its Functions in the Inca State (1962), and El mundo andino: población, medio ambiente y economía (2002). After his retirement, he worked at the National Museum of Ethnography in La Paz, Bolivia.

He died in his home in Ithaca, New York, in 2006.

References

External links
 Register to the Papers of John Victor Murra, National Anthropological Archives, Smithsonian Institution
 John Murra books collection, Collection at the Humanities Library (Universitat Autònoma de Barcelona)

1916 births
2006 deaths
Soviet emigrants to the United States
University of Chicago alumni
University of Puerto Rico faculty
Vassar College faculty
Academic staff of the National University of San Marcos
Yale University faculty
Cornell University faculty
Incan scholars
20th-century American anthropologists